This is a list of years in Mandatory Palestine.

Mandatory Palestine (1920–1948)

British-administered Palestine (pre-Mandate) (1918–1920)

See also
Timeline of Israeli history
Timeline of the region of Palestine
List of years in Israel
List of years in the Palestinian territories
List of years by country

 
year
year